The 60th Cannes Film Festival ran from 16 to 27 May 2007. The President of the Jury was British director Stephen Frears. Twenty two films from twelve countries were selected to compete for the Palme d'Or. The awards were announced on 26 May. 4 Months, 3 Weeks and 2 Days, directed by Cristian Mungiu won the Palme d'Or.

The festival opened with My Blueberry Nights, directed by Wong Kar-wai and closed with Days of Darkness (L'Âge des ténèbres) by Denys Arcand. Diane Kruger was the mistress of ceremonies.

The official poster of the 60th Cannes festival featured Pedro Almodóvar, Juliette Binoche, Jane Campion, Souleymane Cissé, Penélope Cruz, Gérard Depardieu, Samuel L. Jackson, Bruce Willis and Wong Kar-wai, all photographed by Alex Majoli.

Juries

Main competition
The following people were appointed as the Jury for the feature films of the 2007 Official Selection:
Stephen Frears (British director) Jury President
Marco Bellocchio (Italian director)
Maggie Cheung (Hong Kong actress)
Toni Collette (Australian actress)
Maria de Medeiros (Portuguese actress)
Orhan Pamuk (Nobel Prize winning Turkish novelist)
Michel Piccoli (French actor)
Sarah Polley (Canadian actress and director)
Abderrahmane Sissako (Mauritanian director)

Un Certain Regard
The following people were appointed as the Jury of the 2007 Un Certain Regard:
Pascale Ferran (French director) President
Kent Jones (American writer)
Cristi Puiu (Romanian director)
Bian Qin
Jasmine Trinca (Italian actress)

Cinéfondation and short films
The following people were appointed as the Jury of the Cinéfondation and short films competition:
Jia Zhangke (Chinese director) President
Niki Karimi (Iranian actress, filmmaker)
J. M. G. Le Clézio (French writer)
Dominik Moll (German director)
Deborah Nadoolman (American costume designer)

Caméra d'Or
The following people were appointed as the Jury of the 2007 Caméra d'Or:
Pavel Lungin (Russian writer, director) President
Renato Berta (Swiss cinematographer)
Julie Bertuccelli (French director)
Clotilde Courau (French actress)

Official selection

In competition – Feature films
The following feature films competed for the Palme d'Or:

Un Certain Regard
The following films were selected for the competition of Un Certain Regard:

Actrices by Valeria Bruni Tedeschi (France)
And Along Come Tourists (Am Ende kommen Touristen) by Robert Thalheim (Germany)
The Band's Visit (Bikur Ha-Tizmoret) by Eran Kolirin (Israel)
Blind Mountain by Li Yang (China)
California Dreamin' by Cristian Nemescu (Romania)
Calle Santa Fe by Carmen Castillo (Chile)
Et toi, t'es sur qui? by Lola Doillon (France)
Flight of the Red Balloon by Hou Hsiao-hsien (France, Taiwan)
Kuaile Gongchang by Ekachai Uekrongtham (Thailand)
Magnus by Kadri Kõusaar (Estonia, United Kingdom)
Mio fratello è figlio unico by Daniele Luchetti (Italy)
Mister Lonely by Harmony Korine (United States)
Munyurangabo by Lee Isaac Chung (United States)
Night Train by Diao Yi'nan (China)
The Pope's Toilet (El Baño del Papa) by Enrique Fernandez and César Charlone (Uruguay)
La soledad by Jaime Rosales (Spain)
A Stray Girlfriend by Ana Katz (Argentina)
Terror's Advocate by Barbet Schroeder (France)
Water Lilies by Celine Sciamma (France)
You, the Living (Du levande) by Roy Andersson (Sweden)

Films out of competition
The following films were selected to be screened out of competition:

Boarding Gate by Olivier Assayas (France)
Days of Darkness (L'Âge des ténèbres) by Denys Arcand (Canada, France)
Déficit by Gael García Bernal (Mexico)
Expired by Cecilia Miniucchi (United States)
Go Go Tales by Abel Ferrara (United States, Italy)
Héros by Bruno Merle (France)
A Mighty Heart by Michael Winterbottom (United States, United Kingdom)
Ocean's Thirteen by Steven Soderbergh (United States)
Sicko by Michael Moore (United States)
To Each His Own Cinema (Chacun son cinéma) (various) (France)
Triangle (Tie saam gok) by Ringo Lam, Johnny To, Tsui Hark (Hong Kong, China)
U2 3D by Catherine Owens, Mark Pellington (United States)

Special screenings
The following films were screened specially for the 60th Festival.

11th Hour by Nadia Conners, Leila Conners Petersen (United States)
Rebellion: the Litvinenko Case by Andrei Nekrasov (Russia)
Boxes by Jane Birkin (France)
Cartouches Gauloises by Mehdi Charef (France, Algeria)
Cruising by William Friedkin (United States, Germany)
Fengming, a Chinese Memoir (He Fengming) by Wang Bing (China)
One Hundred Nails (Centochiodi) by Ermanno Olmi (Italy)
Retour en Normandie by Nicolas Philibert (France)
Roman de gare by Claude Lelouch (France)
Ulzhan by Volker Schlöndorff (Germany)
The War, by Ken Burns, Lynn Novick (United States)
Young Yakuza by Jean-Pierre Limosin (France, United States, Japan)

Cinéfondation
The following short films were selected for the competition of Cinéfondation:

A Reunion by Sung-Hoon Hong
Aditi singh by Mickael Kummer
Ahora todos parecen contentos by Gonzalo Tobal
 by Efrat Corem
Chinese Whispers by Raka Dutta
For the Love of God by Joe Tucker
Goyta by Joanna Jurewicz
Halbe Stunden by Nicolas Wackerbarth
Minus by Pavle Vuckovic
Mish'olim by Hagar Ben-Asher
Neostorozhnost by Alexander Kugel
Rondo by Marja Mikkonen
Ru Dao by Tao Chen
Saba by Thereza Menezes, Gregorio Graziosi
Triple 8 Palace by Alexander Ku
Vita di Giacomo by Luca Governatori

Short film competition
The following short films competed for the Short Film Palme d'Or:

Ah Ma by Anthony Chen (Singapore)
Ark by Grzegorz Jonkajtys (Poland)
The Last 15 by Antonio Campos (United States)
Looking Glass by Erik Rosenlund (Sweden)
My Dear Rosseta by Yang Hae-hoon (South Korea)
My Sister by Marco Van Geffen (Netherlands)
The Oates' Valor by Tim Thaddeus Cahill United States)
Resistance aux tremblements by Olivier Hems (France)
Run by Mark Albiston (New Zealand)
 by Kyros Papavassiliou (Cyprus)
Ver Llover by Elisa Miller (Mexico)

Cannes Classics
Cannes Classics places the spotlight on documentaries about cinema and restored masterworks from the past. 

Tributes
Hamlet by Laurence Olivier (1948)
Kanał by Andrzej Wajda (1956)
Richard III by Laurence Olivier (1955)
Henry V by Laurence Olivier (1944)

Documentaries about Cinema
Brando by Mimi Freedman & Leslie Greif (United States)
Lindsay Anderson, Never Apologize by Mike Kaplan (United States)
Maurice Pialat, L'amour existe by Anne-Marie Faux & Jean-Pierre Devillers (France)
Pierre Rissient by Todd McCarthy (United States)

Restored prints

Bound by Chastity Rules by Shin Sang-Ok (1962)
Die Abenteuer des Prinzen Achmed by Lotte Reiniger (1926)
My Last Mistress (Donne-moi tes yeux) by Sacha Guitry (1943)
Dracula by Terence Fisher (1958)
Hondo by John Farrow (1953)
La Bandera by Julien Duvivier (1935)
Made In Jamaica by Jérôme Laperrousaz (2006)
Mikey & Nicky by Elaine May (1976)
Forest of the Hanged (Pădurea spânzuraților) by Liviu Ciulei (1964)
Suspiria by Dario Argento (1977)
Twelve Angry Men by Sidney Lumet (1957)
Words for Battle by Humphrey Jennings (1941, short)
Yo Yo (Yoyo) by Pierre Etaix (1965)

Parallel sections

International Critics' Week
The following films were screened for the 46th International Critics' Week (46e Semaine de la Critique):

Feature film competition

À l'intérieur by Julien Maury, Alexandre Bustillo (France)
El Asaltante by Pablo Fendrik (Argentina)
Funuke Show Some Love, You Losers! (Funuke domo, kanashimi no ai wo misero) by Daihachi Yoshida (Japan)
In Your Wake (Nos retrouvailles) by David Oelhoffen (France)
Jellyfish (Meduzot) by Etgar Keret, Shira Geffen (Israel, France)
The Milky Way (A via láctea) by Lina Chamie (Brazil)
The Orphanage (El Orfanato) by Juan Antonio Bayona (Spain, Mexico)
Párpados azules by Ernesto Contreras (Mexico)
Voleurs de chevaux by Micha Wald (Belgium, France, Canada)
XXY by Lucia Puenzo (Argentina, France, Spain)

Short film competition

Um ramo by Juliana Rojas & Marco Dutra (Brazil)
Madame Tutli-Putli by Chris Lavis & Maciek Szczerbowski (Canada)
Saliva by Esmir Filho (Brazil)
Rabbit Troubles by Dimitar Mitovski & Kamen Kalev (Bulgaria)
Fog by Peter Salmon (New Zealand)
La Route, la nuit by Marine Alice le Du (France)
Both by Bass Bre’che (United Kingdom, Lebanon)

Special screenings

Héros by Bruno Merle (France) (opening film)
Déficit by Gael García Bernal (Mexico) (La séance du Parrain)
Malos hábitos by Simón Bross (Mexico) (La séance du Parrain)
The Mosquito Problem and Other Stories by Andrey Paounov (Bulgaria, United States, Germany) (Documentary)
Primrose Hill by Mikhaël Hers (France) (Short film)
Situation Frank by Patrik Eklund (Sweden) (Short film)
Chambre 616 by Frédéric Pelle (France) (Prix de la Critique)
Expired by Cecilia Miniucchi (United States) (closing film)

Directors' Fortnight
The following films were screened for the 2007 Directors' Fortnight (Quinzaine des Réalizateurs): 

Après lui by Gaël Morel (France)
Avant que j'oublie by Jacques Nolot (France)
Caramel by Nadine Labaki (Lebanon, France)
Chop Shop by Ramin Bahrani (United States)
Control by Anton Corbijn (Hungary)
Dai Nipponjin by Hitoshi Matsumoto (Japan)
Foster Child (John John) by Brillante Mendoza (Philippines)
Her Name Is Sabine (Elle s'appelle Sabine) by Sandrine Bonnaire (France)
Garage by Lenny Abrahamson (Ireland)
L'état du monde by Chantal Akerman (Belgium), Apichatpong Weerasethakul (Thailand), Vicente Ferraz (Brazil), Ayisha Abraham (India), Wang Bing (China), Pedro Costa (Portugal)
Counterparts (L'un contre l'autre) by Jan Bonny (Germany)
La France by Serge Bozon (France)
La Question humaine by Nicolas Klotz (France)
La Influencia by Pedro Aguilera (Mexico)
Mutum by Sandra Kogut (Brazil, France)
Ploy by Pen-ek Ratanaruang (Thailand)
PVC-1 by Spiros Stathoulopoulos (Colombia)
Savage Grace by Tom Kalin (United States, France, Spain)
Smiley Face by Gregg Araki (United States, Germany)
Tout est pardonné by Mia Hansen-Løve (France)
Un homme perdu by Danielle Arbid (Lebanon, France)
Yumurta by Semih Kaplanoglu (Turkey, Greece)
Zoo by Robinson Devor (United States)

Tous Les Cinemas du Monde
Tous Les Cinemas du Monde (World Cinema) began in 2005 to showcase films from a variety of different countries. From 19 May to 25 May 2007, films were screened from India, Lebanon, Poland, Kenya, Guinea, Angola, Slovenia, and Colombia.

India
The first two days of this program held during 19 May to 25 May 2007 featured special screening of Indian films; Saira (2005), Missed Call (2005), Lage Raho Munna Bhai (2006), Dosar (2006), Veyil, (2006), Guru (2007), Dhan Dhana Dhan Goal (2007), and Dharm (2007).

Lebanon
Debuting at the Director's Fortnight was Nadine Labaki's Caramel, a charming dramedy about five women who gather at a beauty salon and deal with their everyday problems with men, social expectation, sexuality, and tradition vs. modernizing times. Labaki not only directed and co-wrote the film but plays the lead as well. The rest of the cast is composed mostly of unprofessional actors, all of whom deliver very convincing performances and add a lot of color and depth to the film. Reminiscent of a Pedro Almodóvar picture, Caramel is unique not just for its technical and creative sophistication but also for not tackling any of the religious, political, or war-related issues that have continued to plague its setting, Lebanon, til now. The film proved to be a sleeper at the festival and was distributed in well over 40 countries, becoming an international hit.

Awards

Official awards
The following films and people received the 2007 Official selection awards:
Palme d'Or: 4 Months, 3 Weeks and 2 Days by Cristian Mungiu
Grand Prix: The Mourning Forest (Mogari no Mori) by Naomi Kawase
Best Director Award: Julian Schnabel for The Diving Bell and the Butterfly
Best Screenplay Award: Fatih Akın for The Edge of Heaven (Auf der anderen Seite)
Best Actress: Jeon Do-yeon in Secret Sunshine
Best Actor: Konstantin Lavronenko in The Banishment
Prix du Jury:
Persepolis by Vincent Paronnaud, Marjane Satrapi
Silent Light by Carlos Reygadas
60th Anniversary Prize: Paranoid Park by Gus Van Sant
Un Certain Regard
Prix Un Certain Regard: California Dreamin', by Cristian Nemescu
Un Certain Regard Special Jury Prize: Actrices by Valeria Bruni Tedeschi
Heart Throb Jury Prize: The Band's Visit (Bikur Ha-Tizmoret) by Eran Kolirin
Short Film Special Distinction: Run by Mark Albiston
Cinéfondation
First Prize: Ahora todos parecen contentos by Gonzalo Tobal
Second Prize: Ru Dao by Tao Chen
Third Prize: Minus by Pavle Vuckovic
Golden Camera
Caméra d'Or: Jellyfish (Meduzot) by Etgar Keret and Shira Geffen
Special mention: Control by Anton Corbijn
Short films
Short Film Palme d'Or: Ver Llover by Elisa Miller
Special mention: Ah Ma by Anthony Chen & Run by Mark Albiston

Independent awards
FIPRESCI Prizes
4 Months, 3 Weeks and 2 Days by Cristian Mungiu (In competition)
The Band's Visit (Bikur Ha-Tizmoret) by Eran Kolirin (Un Certain Regard)
Her Name is Sabine (Elle s'appelle Sabine) by Sandrine Bonnaire
Vulcan Award of the Technical Artist
Vulcan Award: Janusz Kamiński (cinematographer) for The Diving Bell and the Butterfly (Le Scaphandre et le Papillon)
Ecumenical Jury
Prize of the Ecumenical Jury: The Edge of Heaven (Auf der anderen Seite) by Fatih Akın
Awards in the frame of International Critics' Week
Canal+ Gran Prix for short film: Madame Tutli-Putli
Petit Rail d'Or (presented by "cinephile railwaymen") for Madame Tutli-Putli
Other awards
Special Mention by the CICAE Jury Cannes: Counterparts by Jan Bonny
Association Prix François Chalais
Prix François Chalais: A Mighty Heart by Michael Winterbottom

References

Media
INA: Climbing of the steps : protocol (commentary in French)
INA: List of winners of the 2007 Cannes Festival (commentary in French)

External links

2007 Cannes Film Festival (web.archive)
Official website Retrospective 2007 
Cannes Film Festival Awards for 2007 at Internet Movie Database

Cannes Film Festival
Cannes Film Festival
Cannes Film Festival
Cannes Film Festival
Cannes Film Festival